Pallot may refer to:

Nerina Pallot, British Singer
Pallot's Marriage Index
Pallot's Baptism Index
Pallot Heritage Steam Museum
Ishmael's boyfriend